Skytop Lodge is a resort hotel that opened in June 1928. It is a member of Historic Hotels of America.

The hotel is situated on a  wooded site in Skytop, Pennsylvania, at an elevation of 1,500 feet in the Poconos. The property includes a 75-acre lake, 30 miles of hiking trails, and an 18-hole golf course. Built at a cost of $750,000, the Dutch Colonial Revival hotel was designed by Rossiter & Muller and Mortimer Foster of New York. The Olmstead Brothers of Boston were hired to situate the hotel and design its gardens and grounds. 

The hotel has been described as "a Dutch Colonial-style field-stone castle in a country club setting," and as looming "like a palatial hunting chateau in a wide clearing in the woods – so grand you might think you were trespassing on the estate of an English lord."

Its golf course was begun in March 1926, and was opened in 1928 along with the hotel.

References

Hotels in Pennsylvania
Buildings and structures in Monroe County, Pennsylvania
1928 establishments in Pennsylvania
Hotels established in 1928
Hotel buildings completed in 1928
Historic Hotels of America